David Thomas Gaul (July 7, 1886 – August 6, 1962) was an American competition swimmer.  He represented the United States as a 17-year-old at the 1904 Summer Olympics in St. Louis, Missouri, where he finished in fourth place in the 50- and 100-yard freestyle events. Gaul died in Pennsylvania at the age of 76.

References

External links

Mention of David Gaul's death

1886 births
1962 deaths
American male freestyle swimmers
Olympic swimmers of the United States
Swimmers at the 1904 Summer Olympics